The 1979 Hang Ten 400 was an endurance motor race held at the Sandown Park circuit in Victoria, Australia on 9 September 1979. It was staged over 129 laps of the 3.11 km circuit, a total of 401 km. The race was Round 1 of the 1979 Australian Championship of Makes and as such it was open to Group C Touring Cars. It was the fourteenth in a sequence of annual Sandown long distance races. The race was won by Peter Brock.

Classes
Cars competed in three classes according to engine capacity: 
 Class A: 3001 to 6000cc
 Class B: 2001 to 3000cc
 Class C: Up to 2000cc

Results

There were 48 starters and 22 finishers in the race.

The known non-finishers are listed in alphabetical order due to a lack of information concerning laps completed.

References

Motorsport at Sandown
Hang Ten 400
Pre-Bathurst 500